The 1993–94 season was Atlético Madrid's 63rd season since foundation in 1903 and the club's 59th season in La Liga, the top league of Spanish football. Atlético competed in La Liga, the Copa del Rey, and the UEFA Cup.

Squad

Transfers

In

Out

Results

La Liga

League table

Position by round

Matches

Copa del Rey

UEFA Cup

Squad statistics

Appearances and goals

Disciplinary record

References

External links

 Official website

Atlético Madrid seasons
Atlético Madrid